This section of the timeline of New France history concerns the events between Jacques Cartier's first voyage and the foundation of the Quebec settlement by Samuel de Champlain.

1500-1589

1534 - On July 24, Jacques Cartier plants a cross on the Gaspé Peninsula and claims it for France.
1535 - Cartier's expedition sails along the St. Lawrence River and stops in a little bay he names Baie Saint-Laurent on August 10.
1535 - On September 6, Cartier is the first European to discover L'Isle-aux-Coudres, Quebec.
1535 - Cartier continues to sail up the St. Lawrence to the village of Hochelaga on October 2.
1537 - On June 9, Pope Paul III proclaims that since the Sauvages (Indians) are real humans, they must receive the Roman Catholic faith.
1541 - Cartier builds the Charlesbourg-Royal fort, the first permanent European settlement in North America, near the confluence of the Rivière du Cap Rouge with the St. Lawrence.

1590s 

1600-1607 
1600 - Pierre de Chauvin de Tonnetuit founds a trading post at Tadoussac.
1603 - Samuel de Champlain takes possession of lands he calls (Newfoundland) and Acadie (Acadia).
1604 - Pierre Dugua, Sieur de Monts and Samuel de Champlain establish an ill-fated settlement on the lands of the Passamaquoddy Nation that they give the religious name of Île-Saint-Croix.
1605 - Dugua and Champlain move the settlement to the Mi'kmaq Nation lands the French called Habitation at Port-Royal, near Annapolis Royal in present-day Nova Scotia. See Acadia.
1606 - Marc Lescarbot put on the first European theatrical production in North America. It was called Le Théâtre de Neptune.
1607 - On May 14, Captain Christopher Newport founds the first English colony on lands of the  Paspahegh Indians  in what they called America: Jamestown, Virginia.

See also

 New France 
 French colonial empire 
 Colonialism
 France

References

 1534
 1600
1534
Quebec 1534
1534
Quebec 1534
Quebec 1600
1600s in Canada
.1534